On the Air Live with Captain Midnight is a 1979 American comedy-drama film directed by Beverly Sebastian and Ferd Sebastian with Tracy Sebastian as Marvin Ziegler, also known as Captain Midnight (not to be confused with the Captain Midnight serial character from the 1930s and 1940s), who runs his own pirate radio station and becomes an underground cult hit.

The film was released in 1979 although it was filmed in 1977.  The film is about a teenager who has a mobile broadcast transmitter in his van that allows him to take over the airwaves as a renegade disc jockey.  Veteran Los Angeles DJ Jim Ladd co-stars in the film as a disc jockey.

In popular culture 
Drawing upon the pirate radio themes in the film, the protagonist's name was later used in the 1986 Captain Midnight pirate satellite broadcast on HBO protesting scrambling equipment and high fees.

References

External links 

 

Vansploitation films
1979 films
Films about pirate radio
1979 comedy-drama films
1970s English-language films
American comedy-drama films
Films directed by Beverly Sebastian
Films directed by Ferd Sebastian
1970s American films